Pelochyta semivitrea is a moth of the family Erebidae. It was first described by Paul Dognin in 1907. It is found in Peru.

References

Pelochyta
Moths described in 1907